Corallancyla is a genus of beetles in the family Cerambycidae.

Species
The genus contains the following species:

 Corallancyla durantoni Penaherrera-Leiva & Tavakilian, 2003
 Corallancyla neotropica Tippmann, 1960

References

Rhinotragini
Cerambycidae genera